A. P. Tugwell (November 7, 1889 – February 12, 1976) was an American politician who served as Treasurer of Louisiana from 1936 to 1968. Tugwell had previously served as Chairman of the Louisiana Highway Commission.

Early life and education 
Tugwell was born in Plain Dealing, Louisiana, and raised in Winn Parish, Louisiana, where he attended public schools. He then graduated from the State Normal College at Natchitoches (now Northwestern State University).

Career 
During Huey Long's tenure as governor, Tugwell was appointed as the first auditor for the Louisiana Railroad Commission. He was later appointed head of the Louisiana Highway Commission. Tugwell was elected Treasurer of Louisiana in 1936. He was the running mate of former governor Sam H. Jones in the 1948 Louisiana gubernatorial election, though the ticket was defeated by Earl Long and Bill Dodd. To date, Tugwell is the longest-serving Treasurer of Louisiana.

Death 
Tugwell died on February 12, 1976, in Baton Rouge, Louisiana.

References 

1889 births
1976 deaths
People from Winn Parish, Louisiana
Northwestern State University alumni
Politicians from Baton Rouge, Louisiana
Louisiana Democrats
State treasurers of Louisiana
20th-century American politicians